Princess Princess may refer to:

 Princess Princess (band), Japanese rock band
 Princess Princess (manga), anime and manga series
 Princess-Princess, a character from the webcomic Sluggy Freelance